The 2016 South Carolina Gamecocks baseball team represents the University of South Carolina in the 2016 NCAA Division I baseball season.  The Gamecocks play their home games in Carolina Stadium. The team is coached by Chad Holbrook, who is in his fourth season as head coach at Carolina.

Personnel

Roster
{| class="toccolours" style="border-collapse:collapse; font-size:90%;"
|-
! colspan="7" style="background:#73000A;color:white; border: 2px solid #000000;text-align:center;"| 2016 South Carolina Gamecocks active roster
|-
|-
|width="03"| 
|valign="top"|
Pitchers
6 – Clarke Schmidt – Sophomore
9 – Brandon Murray – Sophomore
13 – Colton Provey – Junior
15 – Adam Hill – Freshman
16 – Harrison Smith – Freshman
17 – Taylor Widener – Junior
18 – Tyler Haswell – Sophomore
21 – Tyler Johnson – Sophomore
23 – Vince Fiori – Senior
24 – Alex Destino – Sophomore
26 – Matthew Vogel – Junior
27 – Hayden Hefline – Junior
28 – John Parke – Junior
30 – Braden Webb – Freshman
32 – Canaan Cropper – Sophomore
35 – Kyle Anderson – Freshman
37 – Wil Crowe – Junior
39 – Reed Scott – Junior
40 – Colie Bowers – Junior
46 – Dillon Hodge – Junior"
47 – Josh Reagan – Junior49 – Hank Nichols – FreshmanCatchers
22 – John Jones – Sophomore33 – Chris Cullen – Freshman38 – Hunter Taylor – Sophomore|width="20"| 
| valign="top" |
Infielders
7 – DC Arendas – Senior8 – Marcus Mooney – Senior11 – LT Tolbert – Freshman14 – Madison Stokes – Sophomore20 – Jonah Bride – Sophomore24 – Alex Destino – Sophomore25 – Ross Grosvenor – Junior34 – Collin Steagall – Senior45 – Caleb Whitenton – Freshman48 – Matt Williams – SophomoreOutfielders
3 – Jared Williams – Freshman4 – Danny Blair – Freshman5 – TJ Hopkins – Freshman10 – Clark Scolamiero – Sophomore19 – Gene Cone – Junior31 – Weber Pike – Junior42 – Dom Thompson-Williams – Junior44 – Brandon McIlwain – Freshman|width="40"| 
|}
2016 South Carolina Gamecocks Baseball Roster & Bios

Coaching staff

2016 South Carolina Gamecocks Baseball Coaches & Bios

Schedule

! style=""|Regular Season
|- valign="top" 

|- bgcolor=ccffcc
| February 19 || Albany || Founders Park • Columbia, SC ||   || W 10–1 || Schmidt (1–0) || Woods (0–1) || None || 7,434 || 1–0 || 
|- bgcolor=ccffcc
| February 20 || Albany || Founders Park • Columbia, SC ||   || W 6–2 || Webb (1–0) || Failing (0–1) || Reagan (1) || 7,825 || 2–0 || 
|- bgcolor=ccffcc
| February 21 || Albany || Founders Park • Columbia, SC ||   || W 8–1 || Bowers (1–0) || Romero (0–1) || None || 7,221 || 3–0 || 
|- bgcolor=ccffcc
| February 23 ||  || Founders Park • Columbia, SC ||   || W 5–0 || Hill (1–0) || Gorham (0–1) || None || 6,423 || 4–0 || 
|- bgcolor=ccffcc
| February 24 ||  || Founders Park • Columbia, SC ||   || W 16–4 || Haswell (1–0) || Sultan (0–1) || None || 6,523 || 5–0 || 
|- bgcolor=ccffcc
| February 26 ||  || Founders Park • Columbia, SC ||   || W 7–1 || Schmidt (2–0) || Lehman (0–2) || None || 7,014 || 6–0 || 
|- bgcolor=ccffcc
| February 27 || Penn State || Founders Park • Columbia, SC ||   || W 16–5 || Webb (2–0) || Biasi (1–1) || None || 7,668 || 7–0 || 
|- bgcolor=ccffcc
| February 28 || Penn State || Founders Park • Columbia, SC ||   || W 4–2 || Scott (1–0) || Hagenman (1–1) || Reagan (2) || 7,804 || 8–0 || 
|-

|- bgcolor=ccffcc
| March 1 || at The Citadel || Riley Park • Charleston, SC ||   || W 6–3 || Hill (2–0) || Watcher (1–1) || Reagan (3) || 6,298 || 9–0 || 
|- bgcolor=ccffcc
| March 4 || Clemson || Founders Park • Columbia, SC ||   || W 8–1  || Schmidt (3–0) || Barnes (1–1) || None || 8,242 || 10–0 || 
|- bgcolor=ffbbb
| March 5 || Clemson || Fluor Field • Greenville, SC ||   || L 5–0 || Schmidt (3–0) || Webb (2–1) || Krall (1) || 7,216 || 10–1 || 
|- bgcolor=ffbbb
| March 6 || at Clemson || Doug Kingsmore Stadium • Clemson, SC ||   || L 4–1 || Eubanks (2–1) || Widener (0–1) || Bostic (1) || 6,524 || 10–2 || 
|- bgcolor=ccffcc
| March 8 || Wofford || Founders Park • Columbia, SC ||   || W 7–1  || Hill (3–0) || Higginbotham (0–2) || None || 6,432 || 11–2 || 
|- bgcolor=ccffcc
| March 9 || Furman  || Founders Park • Columbia, SC ||   || W 5–4  || Haswell (2–0) || Dvorak (0–1) || Reagan (4) || 6,325 || 12–2 || 
|- bgcolor=ccffcc
| March 11 ||   || Founders Park • Columbia, SC ||   || W 9–0 || Schmidt (4–0) || Raynor (3–1) || None || 6,670 || 13–2 || 
|- bgcolor=ccffcc
| March 12 || Charleston Southern || Founders Park • Columbia, SC ||   || W 5–4 || Webb (3–1) || Johnson (2–2) || Reagan (5) || 7,412 || 14–2 || 
|- bgcolor=ccffcc
| March 13 || Charleston Southern || Founders Park • Columbia, SC ||   || W 2–0 || Hill (4–0) || Piriz (0–2) || Reagan (6) || 6,643 || 15–2 || 
|- bgcolor=ccffcc
| March 15 ||  || Fluor Field • Greenville, SC ||   || W 12–6 || Murray (1–0) || Jackson (2–2) || None || 2,005 || 16–2 || 
|- bgcolor=ccffcc
| March 16 || Davidson || Founders Park • Columbia, SC ||   || W 15–2 || Vogel (1–0) || Roberts (0–2) || None || 6,525 || 17–2 || 
|- bgcolor=ccffcc
| March 18 || Arkansas  || Founders Park • Columbia, SC ||   || W 10–6 || Schmidt (5–0) || Taccolini (3–1) || None || 7,511 || 18–2 || 1–0
|- bgcolor=ccffcc
| March 19 || Arkansas || Founders Park • Columbia, SC ||   || W 6–2 || Webb (4–1) || Teague (2–2) || Johnson (1) || 7,258 || 19–2 || 2–0
|- bgcolor=ccffcc
| March 20 || Arkansas || Founders Park • Columbia, SC ||   || W 8–6 || Reagan (1–0) || Jackson (1–2) || None || 6,867 || 20–2 || 3–0
|- bgcolor=ccffcc
| March 24 || at Ole Miss || Swayze Field • Oxford, Mississippi || #18 || W 5–1 || Schmidt (6–0) || Bramlett (4–1) || Reagan (7) || 8,167 || 21–2 || 4–0
|- bgcolor=ccffcc
| March 25 || at Ole Miss || Swayze Field • Oxford, MS || #18 || W 9–5 || Webb (5–1) || Smith (2–2) || None || 9,064 || 22–2 || 5–0
|- bgcolor=ccffcc
| March 26 || at Ole Miss || Swayze Field • Oxford, MS || #18 || W 4–0 || Hill (5–0) || Pagnozzi (4–1) || Johnson (2) || 10,184 || 23–2 || 6–0
|- bgcolor=ffbbb
| March 26 ||  || Founders Park • Columbia, SC || #18 || L 5–613 || Love (1–1) || Scott (1–1) || Hunt (1) || 8,242 || 23–3 || 
|- bgcolor=ffbbb
| March 26 || at Vanderbilt || Hawkins Field • Nashville, TN || #18 || L 3–6 || Sheffield (4–1) || Schmidt (6–1) || Bowden (3)'' || 3,384 || 23–4 || 6–1
|-

|- bgcolor=
| April 1 || at Vanderbilt || Hawkins Field • Nashville, TN || #7  ||  ||  ||  ||  || ||  || 
|- bgcolor=
| April 2 ||   ||   || #7 ||  ||   ||  ||   ||   ||   ||
|- bgcolor=
| April 5 ||   ||   || #8 ||    ||   ||   ||   ||   ||   ||
|- bgcolor=
| April 8||   ||   || #8 ||   ||   ||   ||   ||   ||   ||  
|- bgcolor=
| April 9 ||   ||   || #8 ||   ||    ||   ||   ||   ||   ||
|- bgcolor=
| April 10 ||   ||   || #8  ||   ||   ||   ||   ||   ||   ||
|- bgcolor=
| April 13 ||   ||   || #5 ||   ||   ||   ||   ||   ||   ||
|- bgcolor=
| April 15 ||   ||   || #5 ||   ||   ||   ||   ||   ||   ||
|- bgcolor=
| April 16 ||   ||   || #5 ||   ||   ||   ||   ||   ||   ||
|- bgcolor=
| April 17 ||   ||   || #5 ||   ||   ||   ||   ||   ||   ||
|- bgcolor=
| April 20 ||   ||   || #12 ||   ||   ||   ||   ||   ||   ||
|- bgcolor=
| April 22 ||   ||   || #12 ||   ||   ||   ||   ||   ||   ||
|- bgcolor=
| April 23 ||   ||   || #12 ||   ||   ||   ||   ||   ||   ||
|- bgcolor=
| April 24 ||   ||   || #12 ||   ||   ||   ||   ||   ||   ||
|- bgcolor=
| April 29 ||   ||   || #6 ||   ||   ||   ||   ||   ||   ||
|- bgcolor=
| April 30 ||   ||   || #6 ||   ||   ||   ||   ||   ||   ||
|-

|-
! style=""|Post-Season
|-

Record vs. conference opponents

Rankings

Gamecocks in the 2016 MLB Draft
The following members of the South Carolina Gamecocks baseball program were drafted in the 2016 Major League Baseball Draft.

References

External links
 Gamecock Baseball official website

South Carolina Gamecocks baseball seasons
South Carolina Gamecocks Baseball Team, 2016
South Carolina
South